Roxana Vladimirova Shahanska (born 23 April 1992) is a Bulgarian footballer who plays as a goalkeeper and the Bulgaria women's national team.

References

1992 births
Living people
Women's association football goalkeepers
Bulgarian women's footballers
Bulgaria women's international footballers
FC NSA Sofia players